The Dry Fork is a  tributary of the Tug Fork, belonging to the Ohio River watershed. The river is located in McDowell County, West Virginia, and Tazewell County, Virginia, in the United States.  The mouth of the Dry Fork into the Tug Fork is located at Iaeger.

Variant names
According to the United States Geological Survey's Geographic Names Information System, the Dry Fork has been known by the following names throughout its history:

Crane Creek 	
Mud Fork 	
South Fork

Tributaries
Tributary streams are listed from source to mouth.

Lick Branch
Ray Fork
Bills Branch
Dick Creek
Laurel Fork
Mile Branch
Beech Fork
Vall Creek
Kewee Creek
Big Branch
Jacobs Fork
Cucumber Creek
Johns Branch
War Creek
Barrenshe Creek
Pruett Branch
Threefork Branch
Bartley Creek
Buck Fork
Johnnycake Hollow
Atwell Branch
Little Slate Branch
Right Fork
Dry Branch
Bradshaw Creek
Oozley Branch
Hurricane Branch
Fishtrap Branch
Beartown Branch
Little Staunch Branch
Staunch Branch
Grapevine Branch
Betsy Branch
Crane Creek
Left Fork
Laurel Fork
Mile Branch
Straight Branch
Coon Branch

List of cities and towns along the Dry Fork
 Apple Grove, West Virginia
 Atwell, West Virginia
 Avondale, West Virginia
 Bartley, West Virginia
 Beartown, West Virginia
 Berwind, West Virginia
 Bradshaw, West Virginia
 Canebrake, West Virginia
 Carlos, West Virginia
 Dunford Village, Virginia
 English, West Virginia
 Excelsior, West Virginia
 Garland, West Virginia
 Iaeger, West Virginia
 Lex, West Virginia
 Lomax, West Virginia
 Raysal, West Virginia
 Rift, West Virginia
 Union City, West Virginia
 Vallscreek, West Virginia
 War, West Virginia
 Yukon, West Virginia

See also
 List of Virginia rivers
 List of West Virginia rivers

References

Rivers of Virginia
Rivers of West Virginia
Rivers of McDowell County, West Virginia
Rivers of Tazewell County, Virginia